Forest Glen is a semi-rural suburb of Sydney, in the state of New South Wales, Australia. Forest Glen is located 54 kilometres north of the Sydney central business district, in the local government area of Hornsby Shire and is part of the Hills District region.

External links

  [CC-By-SA]

Suburbs of Sydney
Hornsby Shire